Colette Mélot (born 20 April 1947) is a member of the Senate of France, representing the Seine-et-Marne department.  She is a member of Agir.

References
Page on the Senate website (in French)

1947 births
Living people
People from Sète
Politicians from Occitania (administrative region)
Union for French Democracy politicians
Union for a Popular Movement politicians
The Republicans (France) politicians
Agir (France) politicians
French Senators of the Fifth Republic
Senators of Seine-et-Marne
Women members of the Senate (France)
21st-century French women politicians
University of Montpellier alumni